"Made of Scars" is the fourth single from Stone Sour's second album Come What(ever) May and the band's seventh single overall. The music video shows the band performing the song live at the Electric Factory in Philadelphia. The song reached number twelve on the US mainstream rock chart. The music video was shot at the Jägermeister Music Tour.

Track listing

Chart positions

Footnotes

2007 singles
Stone Sour songs
2006 songs
Roadrunner Records singles
Songs written by Corey Taylor
Songs written by Shawn Economaki
Songs written by Josh Rand
Songs written by Jim Root
Song recordings produced by Nick Raskulinecz